The Doobie Brothers are an American rock band from San Jose, California. Formed in the fall of 1970, the group was originally a quartet that featured lead vocalist and guitarist Tom Johnston, guitarist and second vocalist Patrick Simmons, bassist Dave Shogren and drummer John Hartman. The current lineup features Johnston and Simmons alongside vocalist and keyboardist Michael McDonald (who originally joined in 1975) and guitarist/violinist John McFee (who originally joined in 1979). The group's touring lineup also features four additional performers: bassist John Cowan (from 1993 to 1995, and since 2010), saxophonist Marc Russo (since 1998), drummer Ed Toth (since 2005) and percussionist Marc Quiñones (since 2018).

Members

1970–1982
Tom Johnston, Patrick Simmons, Dave Shogren and John Hartman founded the Doobie Brothers in the fall of 1970. After the band released its self-titled debut album and recorded two tracks for 1972's follow-up Toulouse Street, Shogren was replaced by Tiran Porter and Michael Hossack was added as a second drummer in December 1971. The Captain and Me followed, after which Hossack was replaced by Keith Knudsen in September 1973. What Were Once Vices Are Now Habits, released in 1974, featured both Hossack and Knudsen. In September 1974, the Doobie Brothers expanded to a six-piece when pedal steel guitarist Jeff "Skunk" Baxter left Steely Dan to join the group. During the tour in promotion of 1975's Stampede, Johnston was forced to take time off due to a stomach illness.

With Johnston having to leave in the middle of a tour, Michael McDonald was brought in on keyboards and vocals. The group released Takin' It to the Streets in 1976. After the release of its follow-up Livin' on the Fault Line, Johnston decided to leave the group due to stylistic differences, and embarked on a solo career. He was not replaced, as McDonald subsequently took over as primary lead vocalist. Minute by Minute was released in 1978, before Jeff Baxter and founding drummer John Hartman left in April 1979 – the former to focus on record production, and the latter to pursue a career in veterinary medicine.

Baxter and Hartman were replaced by John McFee and Chet McCracken, respectively, while Cornelius Bumpus joined on saxophone and keyboards. After recording One Step Closer in 1980, Porter was replaced by Willie Weeks, and backup percussionist Bobby LaKind became an official band member. With both leading members Simmons and McDonald beginning to focus more on their respective solo careers, it was announced in March 1982 that the Doobie Brothers had disbanded. The group returned for a final concert tour in the summer, recordings from which were released the following year as Farewell Tour.

1987–1998
After a five-year absence, the Doobie Brothers reunited in May 1987 for a tour to benefit the Vietnam Veterans Aid Foundation, with a 12-piece lineup including Tom Johnston, Patrick Simmons, Michael McDonald, Jeff Baxter, John McFee, Tiran Porter, John Hartman, Michael Hossack, Keith Knudsen, Chet McCracken, Bobby LaKind and Cornelius Bumpus. Following the tour, the group reformed permanently and signed with Capitol Records, with a six-piece lineup of Johnston, Simmons, Porter, Hartman, Hossack and LaKind. The band's first studio album in nine years, Cycles, was released in May 1989.

After the release of Cycles, the group toured with saxophonist/keyboardist Bumpus and backup keyboardist Dale Ockerman. A few months into the tour, LaKind left due to medical issues and was replaced by Richard Bryant. Jimi Fox also joined as a second touring percussionist. For the tour in promotion of Brotherhood in 1991, Ockerman, Bryant and Fox remained as touring members. The group toured until November 1991, at which point it disbanded for a second time. In October 1992, the band reunited to perform two shows to benefit Bobby LaKind, who had been diagnosed with terminal colon cancer; the regular lineup was joined by former members Michael McDonald, Jeff Baxter, Bumpus and LaKind himself. The percussionist died of his condition on December 24.

In the summer of 1993, the band reformed again with Johnston, Simmons, Hossack and Bumpus joined by John McFee, Willie Weeks and Keith Knudsen; after a few shows, Weeks and Bumpus were replaced by new touring members John Cowan and Danny Hull, respectively. By 1995, the group had been rejoined by McDonald and Bumpus. The tour also saw the introduction of new touring bassist Skylark, while McFee and Knudsen were substituted for select dates by Bernie Chiaravalle and Chet McCracken, respectively. After the recording of Rockin' Down the Highway: The Wildlife Concert, McDonald and Bumpus left, and Ockerman was replaced by Guy Allison.

Since 1998
By summer 1998, Hull had been replaced by Marc Russo. The group released its first studio album in nine years, Sibling Rivalry, in October 2000. The following June, Hossack was sidelined after being injured in a motorcycle accident. He was temporarily replaced by Marvin "M.B." Gordy. After a few months, Hossack returned and Gordy remained as touring percussionist. Ed Wynne temporarily substituted for Russo during a tour in 2002.

In February 2005, Keith Knudsen died of pneumonia. In April, Gordy left the band. When they resumed touring, the group was joined by former Vertical Horizon drummer Ed Toth, who was introduced to them by Hossack. In the spring of 2010, Skylark was forced to leave after suffering a stroke, with John Cowan returning to take his place on tour; Hossack temporarily left around the same time, due to continuing effects stemming from his 2001 accident, with Tony Pia substituting. It later transpired that Hossack had contracted cancer, from which he later died in March 2012. Pia subsequently remained as second drummer.

Allison was replaced by Bill Payne of Little Feat in November 2015. The following summer, Pia left and Toth remained as the sole drummer. In May 2018, Marc Quiñones joined on percussion. In November 2019, it was announced that Michael McDonald would return for a 50th anniversary tour in 2020. However, due to the COVID-19 pandemic, the tour was postponed.

Current members

Official

Touring

Former members

Official

Touring

Timelines

Official members

Touring members

Lineups

References

External links
The Doobie Brothers official website

Doobie Brothers, The